Ermengol (or Armengol) II (died 1038), called the Pilgrim, was the Count of Urgell from 1011 to his death. He was the son of Ermengol I, Count of Urgell and one of his wives. He was a child when he succeeded his father and was put under the regency of his uncle Ramon Borrell, Count of Barcelona until 1018. Ermengol went on a pilgrimage to the Holy Land and died in 1038 at Jerusalem.

With his uncle's help, Armengol began a successful war of reconquest to the south, taking Montmagastre, Alòs, Malagastre, Rubió, and Artesa. Around 1015, the bishop of Urgell, Armengol, repopulated the region of Guissona. Finally, Arnau Mir de Tost occupied the castle of Àger in 1034. The taifa kings of Lleida and Zaragoza also granted lands to him and to the church of Urgell.

He married before November 24, 1031, Constança, also called Velasquita. She survived until 1059 at least and acted as regent for her son Ermengol III. She may have been the homonymous daughter of Bernard I, Count of Besalú and Countess Tota-Adelaide, named in her father’s will in October 1021.

References

Counts of Urgell
11th-century Catalan people
11th-century Visigothic people
1038 deaths

Year of birth unknown